Whitehouse, also spelled White House, is an unincorporated community located within Readington Township in Hunterdon County, New Jersey. The community lies along the former Jersey Turnpike (now U.S. Route 22), just west of Mechanicsville. The Whitehouse–Mechanicsville Historic District, which includes historic places in both Whitehouse and Mechanicsville, was added to the National Register of Historic Places on March 17, 2015.

History
In 1722, Abraham Van Horne purchased  in Readington along the Rockaway Creek. There, he built a grist mill and saw mill.  Around 1750, he built a white plastered wall tavern on the creek where the Jersey Turnpike crossed (this is now the corner of Washington Street and U.S. Route 22).  The tavern began to be referred to as the "White House" by travellers.  The village, which sprang up to the east of the tavern also carried this name.  Stones from the original tavern can be seen along the retaining wall of the Daughters of the American Revolution cemetery, where the tavern once stood.  The community of White House stretched along the Jersey Turnpike (now Route 22 and Old Route 28), which was the main street.  The settlement included taverns, stores, grist mills, an academy, a Dutch Reformed Church and numerous houses.

Nearby Whitehouse Station, which also indirectly took the name from the tavern, was not built up until 1848 when an extension of the Somerville and Easton Railroad was built.

Gallery

References

External links
 
 

Unincorporated communities in Hunterdon County, New Jersey
Unincorporated communities in Readington Township, New Jersey
Unincorporated communities in New Jersey